Panchayat elections were held in the Indian state of West Bengal in May 2018.  The polls were hit with widespread violence.

Results

References

2018 elections in India
Elections in West Bengal
2010s in West Bengal
May 2018 events in India
Local elections in West Bengal
Local government in West Bengal